The county governor (lit. state administrator in English) is a Norwegian government agency that represents the central government administration in every county in Norway. Responsible for a number of supervision and management duties, the governor is the representative of the king and the government of Norway in each county, functioning as the connection between the state and the municipalities. The county governor is subordinate to the Ministry of Local Government and Modernisation but also to the other ministries in their respective duties.

The governor is part of the executive branch and so is formally appointed by the king in a cabinet meeting.

The main responsibilities of the governor include controlling and being an instance of appeal for municipal decisions and the main instance for exercising state regulation of agriculture and local environmental impact. The governor is also responsible for civil matters including marriage, divorce and citizenship. if a municipality fails to balance its budget, the governor enters the municipality into the Register for Governmental Approval of Financial Obligations and obtain some control over the municipality's finances.

The governor of Svalbard has wider authorities, including for the police.

History
The county governor has been an institution since the 12th century, though the institution has had many names, including sysselmann, lensmann, amtmann, fylkesmann and now statsforvalter. 

Prior to 1919, the county governor reported to the diocesan governor, who oversaw all of the counties with a diocese in Norway. The role of diocesan governor was abolished on 1 January 1919.

In 1976, the county municipality was created as a separate, elected body that oversees each county and the role of the county governor was changed to accommodate this.

Governors
After Solberg government's regional reforms, the current county governors serves for the new counties: 

In recent times, county governors are former politicians or have a background in the police force. It is uncommon for governors to hold an office for less than a decade, and many of the present governors were appointed in the 1990s. It has often been seen as a way to retire former high-office politicians from active political duty, and at the same time issue a high-standing position in the public administration at their home place.

Although almost all county governors are former active politicians, it has been regarded as customary that an incumbent county governor does not participate in partisan politics.

See also
Diocesan governor (Norway)

References

Government of Norway
County administration of Norway